The 2016 Coca-Cola GM was the 46th edition of the Greenlandic Men's Football Championship. The final round was held in Nuuk from August 7 to 14. It was won by B-67 Nuuk for the fifth consecutive time and for the twelfth time in its history.

Qualifying stage

North Greenland

Disko Bay

NB Some match results are unavailable.

Central Greenland
Kagssagssuk Maniitsoq qualified for the final Round.

Capital Region
All matches were played in Nuuk.

NB Inuit Timersoqatigiiffiat-79 qualified for the final Round as hosts.

East Greenland
TM-62 qualified for the final Round.

South Greenland
Siuteroq Nanortalik-43 qualified for the final Round.

Final round

Pool 1

Pool 2

Playoffs

Seventh-place match

Fifth-place match

Semi-finals

Third-place match

Final

See also
Football in Greenland
Football Association of Greenland
Greenland national football team
Greenlandic Men's Football Championship

References

Greenlandic Men's Football Championship seasons
Green
Green
Foot